Alain Nef (born 6 February 1982) is a retired Swiss football defender. He last played for FC Zürich.

Career
Alain Nef played in the youth teams of Wädenswil and FC Zürich where he started his professional career in 2001. He won the Swiss Super League with Zürich in 2006. After that he moved to Piacenza Calcio. After two seasons with Piacenza he moved to Udinese Calcio in 2008. On 14 January 2009, Nef went on loan to Spanish club Recreativo de Huelva.

In summer 2009 he was loaned out to Italian Serie B side Triestina. He made his league debut for the club on 21 August 2009 in a 0–0 away draw with AC Mantova. He played all ninety minutes of the match. He scored his first league goal for the club just eight days later in a 1–0 home victory over Grosseto. His goal was scored in the 30th minute.

In November 2010, BSC Young Boys bought him outright and agreed a new contract which last until 30 June 2015. He made his league debut for the club on 12 September 2010 in a 2–2 home draw with FC Basel. He was subbed on in the 38th minute for Emiliano Dudar. He scored his first league goal for the club on 12 December 2010 in a 1–1 home draw with St. Gallen. His goal, scored in the 89th minute, made the score 1–1.

In July 2013, Nef was sold back to FC Zürich for €200,000. His first league appearance upon returning to the club came on 14 July 2013 in a 3–2 home victory over FC Thun. He played all ninety minutes of the match and picked up a yellow card in the 88th minute. He scored his first league goal upon returning to the club on 4 August 2013 in a 3–1 home defeat to his former club BSC Young Boys. His goal, scored in the 60th minute, made the score 2–1. With Zürich he won the Swiss Cup three times: in 2014, 2016 and 2018.

On 23 May 2019, Nef announced his retirement from professional football.

International
He made his senior Switzerland international debut against Cyprus on 20 August 2008.

Style of play

Nef played as a striker in his youth. After that, he played as a winger and then a defender. He lists his position as right-back and his main strength as ball control.

Honors

Club
FC Zürich
Super League: 2005–06
Challenge League: 2016–17
Swiss Cup (4): 2004–05, 2013–14, 2015–16, 2017–18

References

External links
 
 
 FC Zurich Stats

1982 births
Living people
Association football defenders
Swiss men's footballers
Switzerland under-21 international footballers
Switzerland international footballers
FC Zürich players
FC Winterthur players
Piacenza Calcio 1919 players
Udinese Calcio players
Recreativo de Huelva players
U.S. Triestina Calcio 1918 players
BSC Young Boys players
Swiss Super League players
Serie A players
Serie B players
La Liga players
Expatriate footballers in Italy
Expatriate footballers in Spain
Swiss expatriate footballers
Swiss expatriate sportspeople in Italy
Swiss expatriate sportspeople in Spain
People from Wädenswil
Sportspeople from the canton of Zürich